Chuqil Qamiri (Aymara chuqila a people of hunters of the puna, qamiri a demon or false god, kamiri, qamiri creator (God), also spelled Choquel Camiri) is a mountain in the Andes of Bolivia, about  high. It lies in the Oruro Department, Sajama Province, Turco Municipality. Chuqil Qamiri is situated south-west of the mountain Qhapaqa and south-east of the mountains Wila Qullu and Wintu Qachi. The rivers Chuqil Amaya ("Chuqila corpse", Chuquil Amaya, Churquillamaya) and Lupi Tanka ("sun ray hat", Lupitanca) originate east and west of the mountain. They flow to the south

References 

Mountains of Oruro Department